Ingelfingen is a town in the Hohenlohe district, in Baden-Württemberg, Germany. It is situated on the river Kocher, 4 km northwest of Künzelsau, and 36 km northeast of Heilbronn.

Twin towns
Ingelfingen is twinned with:

  Saint-Héand, France, since 1991

Sons and daughters of the place 

 Frederick Louis, Prince of Hohenlohe-Ingelfingen (1747-1818), Prussian general and Hohenlohe prince
 Friedrich Karl Wilhelm, Fürst zu Hohenlohe (1752-1815), Field Marshal Lieutenant, Prince of Hohenlohe-Ingelfingen

References

Hohenlohe (district)
Württemberg